Mario Giovany Acevedo Méndez (born February 15, 1969) is a Guatemalan football forward. He played for many local clubs, most famously CSD Municipal in the Guatemala's top division.

Club career
Nicknamed El Coyote, Acevedo played the majority of his career with Municipal but also had stints with CD Suchitepéquez, Antigua GFC, Cobán Imperial and Mexican side Venados de Yucatán. 
 He is the second highest all-time goalscorer in the domestic league, with 170 goals to his name.

After not being renewed his contract at the end of the 2008-2009 Clausura season, Acevedo was released by his club, and afterwards he announced his retirement from the sport. However, in September 2009, he signed with for Deportivo Heredia, and in February 2010, CD Suchitepéquez confirmed Acevedo was to rejoin them, only for Heredia not to allow him to leave. He then left Heredia in April 2010.

International career
He made his debut for Guatemala in a March 1996 friendly match against Jamaica and has earned a total of 53 caps, scoring 5 goals. He has represented Guatemala in 12 FIFA World Cup qualification matches.

References

External links

 Player profile - CSD Municipal

1969 births
Living people
People from Puerto Barrios
Guatemalan footballers
Guatemala international footballers
C.D. Suchitepéquez players
Cobán Imperial players
C.S.D. Municipal players
Expatriate footballers in Mexico
2001 UNCAF Nations Cup players
2003 UNCAF Nations Cup players
2003 CONCACAF Gold Cup players
Copa Centroamericana-winning players
Antigua GFC players
Association football forwards